The Fox Went out on a Chilly Night: An Old Song is a 1961 American children's picture book written and illustrated by Peter Spier. The book is an illustrated version of the song The Fox. The book was a recipient of a 1962 Caldecott Honor for its illustrations. A film by Weston Woods was made in 2007, sung by Alice Peacock.

References

External links

 https://archive.org/details/foxwentoutonchil0000unse

1961 children's books
American children's books
American picture books
Children's fiction books
Music books
Caldecott Honor-winning works
Children's books adapted into films
English-language books
Works based on songs
Books about foxes
Books about ducks
Fictional geese
Anthropomorphic animals
Books about night
England in fiction
Farms in fiction
Forests in fiction
Autumn in culture